Cyclododecanone is an organic compound with the formula (CH2)11CO.  It is a cyclic ketone that exists as a white solid at room temperature.  It is produced by the oxidation of cyclododecane via cyclododecanol.

Cyclododecanone is mainly consumed as a precursor to 1,12-dodecanedioic acid and laurolactam, which are precursors to certain specialized nylons.  Small amounts are also converted to cyclohexadecanone, which is used in some fragrances.

References

Perfume ingredients
Macrocycles
Mammalian pheromones
Cycloalkanones